Obey may refer to:

Obedience (human behavior), the act of following instructions or recognizing someone's authority
Obey (surname)
Obey (Brainbombs album), a 1995 album by the Swedish band Brainbombs
Obey (Axis of Advance album), a 2004 album by the Canadian band Axis of Advance
Andre the Giant Has a Posse, which spawned the OBEY Giant movement
OBEY (clothing), a fashion line by Shepard Fairey
Obey (Benedictum album), 2013
Obey (The Jacka & Blanco album), 2012
Obey, a 2020 song by the British band Bring Me the Horizon featuring Yungblud
Obey (Upon This Dawning song),2014

See also
Obedience (disambiguation)